Cibyra lagopus is a species of moth of the family Hepialidae. It is known from Suriname.

References

External links
Hepialidae genera

Moths described in 1877
Hepialidae